Richard or Dick Stokes may refer to:
 Richard Stokes (politician), British soldier and politician
 Richard Stokes (producer), British television producer
 Richard Stokes (priest), English Anglican priest
 Dick Stokes (hurler), Irish hurler
 Dick Stokes (footballer), Australian rules footballer

See also
 Ricky Stokes, American athletics administrator and college basketball coach